Barry Live in Britain is the eleventh album released by singer and songwriter Barry Manilow. The album was recorded live at the Royal Albert Hall in London in January 1982 with Victor Vanacore as the musical director. It was a huge success in Britain, soaring to number one on the charts, reaching platinum status.

The LP contains one new song that became a hit single, "Stay" that reached #23 in the UK.

Track listing

Side 1
"It's a Miracle/London" - 5:10
"The Old Songs Medley" - 9:45
"Even Now" - 3:30
"Stay" - 3:15
"Beautiful Music/I Made It Through the Rain" - 7:15

Side 2
"Bermuda Triangle" - 4:05
"Break Down The Door/Who's Been Sleeping In My Bed" - 5:05
"Copacabana (At The Copa)" - 3:40
"Could It Be Magic/Mandy" - 5:40
"London/We'll Meet Again" - 4:25
"One Voice" - 3:04
"It's a Miracle" - 1:05

Personnel
Barry Manilow - vocals
John Pondel - guitar
Carl Sealove - bass
Robert Marullo, Victor Vanacore - keyboards
Bud Harner - drums
Robert Forte - percussion
Bill Page - woodwind

Charts

Certifications

References

1982 live albums
Barry Manilow live albums
Arista Records live albums
Live albums recorded at the Royal Albert Hall